Mall Road is the major hangout point and shopping center in Shimla, the capital city of Himachal Pradesh, India. Constructed during British colonial rule, the Mall road is located a level below The Ridge. The offices of municipal corporation, fire service and police headquarters are located here. Automobiles, except emergency vehicles are not allowed on this road.

Mall Road has a number of showrooms, department stores, shops, restaurants and cafes. A Himachal emporium that offers handicraft products of Himachal Pradesh like locally designed woollen clothes, branded clothes, pottery items, wooden products, and jewellery is also located here.

Attractions

Scandal Point 

Scandal point is where the Mall road joins Ridge road on the west side. The name arose from the commotion caused by the supposed elopement of a British lady with an Indian Maharaja. The story goes that the  Maharaja of Patiala had eloped with the daughter of the British Viceroy. This had led to the Maharaja being banished from entering Shimla by the British authorities. He countered the move by setting himself a new summer capital – now famous hill resort of Chail, 45 km from Shimla. The most prominent feature of the point today is a statue of the Indian freedom fighter Lala Lajpat Rai (no relation to the scandal). Next to Scandal Point is General Post Office.

Gaiety Theatre 

Gaiety Theatre, located on the Mall, was opened on 30 May 1887. Many popular film personalities have performed on its stage. Today, the Gaiety is primarily known for its social club. Schools in Shimla use this theater for performing arts. The theater has been renovated with the original structure untouched to keep its heritage preserved while making it more attractive.

Kali Bari Temple 

The Kali Bari temple was built in 1845 by Bengalis who had come to Simla (summer capital of British India) as British servants from Calcutta (capital of India that time). It is dedicated to the goddess Kali. It is believed that in an ancient temple of Shimla, the goddess Kali existed, near Jakhoo. In the temple a wooden image is worshiped locally.

Town Hall 

The Town Hall Building constructed in 1908 by Scottish Architect James Ransome has been the center of municipal activities since the beginning and it currently houses the Shimla Municipal Corporation. The building adds to the surrounding architecture, reminiscent of the pre-independence era. The large steps and the entrance to this building are a common site for pictures depicting the Mall at Shimla. A project was started in 2014 to restore the building to its original look and more than 8 crore rupees were spent in renovating this colonial architectural marvel.

References

External links

Shimla Tourism at District Administration of Shimla Website

Transport in Shimla
Tourist attractions in Shimla
Roads in Himachal Pradesh
Pedestrian malls
British-era buildings in Himachal Pradesh